St Swithun's Church is a parish church in the Church of England in Woodborough, Nottinghamshire.

History

The church is medieval with the chancel dating from the fourteenth century.

The church is a large structure ... and has some fragments of ancient armorial glass in its windows which, when perfect, was exceedingly beautiful. It is a curacy, and has been augmented with Queen Anne's Bounty. The Chapter of Southwell is the patron, and the Rev. Samuel Lealand Oldacres is the incumbent.

The church is in a joint parish with:
St Laurence's Church, Gonalston
Holy Cross Church, Epperstone
St Peter & St Paul's Church, Oxton

Features

The church contains stained glass windows by Charles Eamer Kempe and also by Morris & Co. to designs by Edward Burne-Jones.

Clock

The clock was installed by Reuben Bosworth in 1856.

References

Church of England church buildings in Nottinghamshire
Grade II* listed churches in Nottinghamshire
Swithun